The Tsipa is the largest tributary of the Vitim in Buryatia, Russia. Maksim Perfilyev was the first Russian to reach the Tsipa in 1640. 

Perch, pike, lenok, grayling, taimen and whitefish are also found in the waters of the Tsipa.

Course
The Tsipa is a western, left tributary of the Vitim. It has its sources in a tarn of the Southern Muya Range, in the area where this range merges with the Ikat Range. It is known as "Upper Tsipa" (Верхняя Ципа) in its upper course until its mouth in lake Baunt in the Baunt Depression in the northeastern part of the Vitim Plateau, near the Bolshoy Khapton Range. The river flows out of the lake in a NNE direction and slows down meandering across a swampy basin where there are many lakes, the largest of which is Busani. Then it turns south and crosses the Babanty Range through a narrow valley where it flows fast, forming rapids.

See also
List of rivers of Russia

References

Rivers of Buryatia